First Travel Solutions is a bus and coach operator in Great Britain. It is a subsidiary of FirstGroup. It provides managed passenger transport from single vehicle operation to hundreds of buses and coaches for sporting and cultural events.

History
The company began operation on 3 February 2004 as First Rail Support. It provided emergency and planned rail replacement transport to train operating companies. In 2016 it was rebranded to First Travel Solutions.

Operations
Through their 24/7 operations centres in Accrington, Lancashire and Leeds, Yorkshire, they provide on-demand and planned passenger transport. This includes corporate transport & emergency and planned rail replacement for train operating companies such as Great Western Railway. It provides ground transport to EasyJet for both crew and passengers during times of disruption. They can call on over 1,700 bus, coach and taxi operators from all over Great Britain.

First Games Transport

In 2010 FirstGroup were awarded the contract to provide buses and coaches for the 2012 Summer Olympics. This involved providing a total of 26 park & ride operations to London Stadium and other venues across London and the rest of the country, with FirstGroup providing 600 of its own buses plus a further 300 sub-contracted from other companies. A 24/7 control centre was established in Barking during the 2012 Games.

It also provided transport for the 2014 Commonwealth Games.

References

FirstGroup bus operators in England
Transport companies established in 2004
2004 establishments in England